Terrence Decarlo Delancy Jr. (born 28 February 1994) is a Bahamian footballer who plays for Cavalier FC and the Bahamas national football team.

Career

College
Delancy attended college at the University of South Florida, playing all four years he attended the school. He scored his lone goal in 71 appearances in his sophomore season during a 4–1 victory over Southern Methodist University.

International
Delancy made his senior international debut on 25 March 2015 in a 5–0 away defeat to Bermuda in World Cup qualifying, coming on as a 75th minute substitute for Kristoff Wood. Nearly four years later, he scored his first international as part of a hat-trick in a 6-1 friendly victory over the Turks and Caicos Islands, netting in the 1st, 8th, and 61st minutes.

Career statistics

International goals
Scores and results list the Bahamas' goal tally first.

Personal life
Delancy is related to Olympic swimmer Nikia Deveaux. In 2008, at the age of 14, Delancy won the Bahamian section of the Red Bull Street Style football freestyle event. With his victory, he qualified for the World Final in São Paulo.

References

External links

1994 births
Living people
Association football midfielders
Bahamian footballers
Sportspeople from Nassau, Bahamas
Bahamian expatriate footballers
Expatriate soccer players in the United States
Bahamian expatriate sportspeople in the United States
South Florida Bulls men's soccer players
Tampa Bay Rowdies 2 players
Cavalier FC players
National Premier Soccer League players
BFA Senior League players
Bahamas international footballers